The 1965 Tennessee Volunteers football team (variously "Tennessee", "UT" or the "Vols") represented the University of Tennessee in the 1965 NCAA University Division football season. Playing as a member of the Southeastern Conference (SEC), the team was led by head coach Doug Dickey, in his second year, and played their home games at Neyland Stadium in Knoxville, Tennessee. They finished the season with a record of eight wins, one loss and two ties (8–1–2 overall, 2–1–2 in the SEC) and a victory over Tulsa in the Bluebonnet Bowl.

Schedule

Personnel

Team players drafted into the NFL

References

Tennessee
Tennessee Volunteers football seasons
Bluebonnet Bowl champion seasons
Tennessee Volunteers football